Bukit Indah Highway is a major highway in Johor Bahru District, Johor, Malaysia.

List of interchanges

References

See also
 Transport in Malaysia

Roads in Iskandar Puteri
Expressways and highways in Johor